Belgian Canadians are Canadian citizens of Belgian ancestry or Belgium-born people who reside in Canada. According to the 2011 census there were 176,615 Canadians who claimed full or partial Belgian ancestry. It encompasses immigrants from both French and Dutch-speaking parts of Belgium.

History 

People from the Southern Netherlands (present-day Belgium) first arrived in the 1660s. A trickle of artisans came to New France before the 1750s. In the mid-19th century there were enough arrivals to open part-time consulates in Montreal, Quebec City and Halifax. After 1859 the main attraction was free farm land. After 1867 the national government gave immigrants from Belgium preferred status, and encouraged emigration to the Francophone Catholic communities of Quebec and Manitoba. Édouard Simaeys became a part-time paid Canadian agent in Belgium to publicize opportunities in Canada and facilitate immigration. The steamship companies prepared their own brochures and offered package deals to farm families.  By 1898 there was a full-time Canadian office in Antwerp which provided pamphlets, lectures and specific travel advice. By 1906 some 2,000 Belgians a year were arriving, most with skills in agriculture. A third wave of immigration took place after 1945, with urban areas the destination.  The 1961 census counted 61,000 Canadians of Belgian ancestry.

Belgian immigration to Western Canada in the late 19th and early 20th century attracted the attention of the Belgian government. It enacted laws and regulations to protect the emigrants and guarantee adequate travel conditions.  Provision was made to assist emigrants who decided to return to Belgium.  Starting in the 1860s consular officials made on-site visits to inspect conditions in Canada, which eagerly welcomed the new arrivals. The Catholic church was likewise welcoming, and a number of priests emigrated. The Walloon immigrants discovered they could continue to speak French in Canada, while the Flemish quickly learned English.  The Belgians formed no national organizations but they were active in local affairs. Some settled in towns such as Saint Boniface, Manitoba, but most became farmers who specialized in dairy farming, sugar beets and market gardening.  After 1920 there was a move to western Alberta, with an economy based on ranching, horse breeding, and sugar beets.

During the Second World War, Belgian émigrés from Canada and elsewhere in the Americas were formed into the 2nd Fusilier Battalion of the Free Belgian Forces, which was based in Canada.

Demographics

Belgian Canadians by Canadian province or territory (2016)

Notable people

Johan Beetz (1874–1949), Belgian-born naturalist and namesake of Baie-Johan-Beetz, Quebec
Gustave Francq (1871–1952), Belgian-born printer and trade unionist
Maurice Baudoux (1902–1988), Belgian-born Catholic priest and Archbishop of Saint Boniface, Manitoba
Alexis Nihon (1902–1980), Belgian-born industrialist
Marcel Lambert (1919–2000), politician and Speaker of the House of Commons of Canada
Émilie Heymans (1981—), Belgian-born Olympic diver.
Lance Stroll (1998—), Formula One driver.

See also

 European Canadians
 Belgian Americans
 Gazette van Detroit (1914–2018)
 Belgium–Canada relations
 Red Star Line

References

Further reading

External links
 Belgian Canadians at The Canadian Encyclopedia.

 
 Belgian diaspora
Belgian

Belgian